Community United Methodist Church may refer to:

 Community United Methodist Church (Half Moon Bay, California)
 First Methodist Episcopal Church and Parsonage (Williams, Arizona)